Matej Pátak (born 8 June 1990) is a Slovak volleyball player. Since the 2018/2019 season, he is playing in the French team Chaumont VB 52.

Sporting achievements

Clubs 
Slovakia Championship:
  2011, 2013
  2012
Slovakia Cup:
  2013
Challenge Cup:
  2017
French Championship:
  2017
  2019

References

External links
 Volleybox profile
 CEV profile
 PlusLiga profile
 Ligue Nationale de Volley profile

1990 births
Living people
Slovak men's volleyball players
People from Dolný Kubín
Sportspeople from the Žilina Region